Louise Farrenc (née Jeanne-Louise Dumont; 31 May 1804 – 15 September 1875) was a French composer, virtuoso pianist and teacher of the Romantic period. Her compositions include three symphonies, a few choral works, numerous chamber pieces and a wide variety of piano music.

Life and career
Born Jeanne-Louise Dumont in Paris, she was the daughter of Jacques-Edme Dumont, a successful sculptor, and sister to Auguste Dumont, also a sculptor. She began piano studies at an early age with Cecile Soria, a former student of Muzio Clementi. When it became clear that she had the ability to become a professional pianist she was given lessons by such masters as Ignaz Moscheles and Johann Nepomuk Hummel, and, given the talent she showed as a composer, her parents decided to let her, in 1819 at the age of fifteen, study composition with Anton Reicha, the composition teacher at the Conservatoire de Paris. However, she was taught through private lessons as women were forbidden to enroll in the traditional composition classes at that time. In 1821 she married Aristide Farrenc, a flute student ten years her senior, who performed at some of the concerts regularly given at the artists' colony of the Sorbonne, where Louise's family lived. Following her marriage, Farrenc interrupted her studies to give concerts throughout France with her husband. He, however, soon grew tired of the concert life and, with her help, opened a publishing house in Paris, which, as Éditions Farrenc, became one of France's leading music publishers for nearly 40 years.

In Paris, Farrenc returned to her studies with Reicha, after which she re-embarked on a concert career, briefly interrupted in 1826 when she gave birth to a daughter, Victorine, who also became a concert pianist but who died in 1859 aged thirty-three. In the 1830s, Farrenc gained considerable fame as a performer and her reputation was such that in 1842 she was appointed to the permanent position of Professor of Piano at the Paris Conservatory, a position she held for thirty years and one which was among the most prestigious in Europe. In fact, Farrenc was the only woman to hold the esteemed position and rank at the Paris Conservatory throughout the 19th century. Accounts of the time record that she was an excellent instructor, with many of her students graduating with first prizes and becoming professional musicians. Despite this, Farrenc was paid less than her male counterparts for nearly a decade. Only after the triumphant premiere of her nonet, at which the famous violinist Joseph Joachim took part, did she demand and receive equal pay.

Farrenc died in Paris.

Music

At first, during the 1820s and 1830s, she composed exclusively for the piano. Several of these pieces drew high praise from critics, including Robert Schumann. In the 1830s, she tried her hand at larger compositions for both chamber ensemble and orchestra. It was during the 1840s that much of her chamber music was written. While the great bulk of Farrenc's compositions were for the piano alone, her chamber music is generally regarded as her best work.

Throughout her life, chamber music remained of great interest. She wrote works for various combinations of winds and or strings and piano. These include two piano quintets, Opp. 30 and 31; a sextet for piano and winds, Op. 40, which later appeared in an arrangement for piano quintet; two piano trios, Opp. 33 and 34; the nonet for winds and strings, Op. 38; a trio for clarinet (or violin), cello, and piano, Op. 44; a trio for flute (or violin), cello, and piano, Op. 45; and several instrumental sonatas (a string quartet sometimes attributed to her is regarded by specialists as the work of another composer, not yet identified).

In addition to chamber music and works for solo piano, she wrote two overtures and three symphonies. She heard her third symphony, Op. 36, performed at the Société des concerts du Conservatoire in 1849. The one area which is conspicuously missing from her output is opera, an important gap as opera was at the time the central musical form in France. Several sources indicate that she was also ambitious in that field, but did not succeed in being given a libretto to set to music by the Théâtre de l'Opéra or the Théâtre de l'Opéra-Comique, for reasons still to be discovered.

Legacy

François-Joseph Fétis, a leading Francophone 19th-century music biographer and critic, wrote in the 2nd edition of his Biographie universelle des musiciens (1862) of Louise Farrenc as follows:

For several decades after Farrenc's death, her reputation as a performer survived and her name continued to appear in such books as Antoine François Marmontel’s Pianistes célèbres. Her nonet had achieved around 1850 some popularity, as did her two piano quintets and her trios. But, despite some new editions of her chamber music after her death, her works were largely forgotten until, in the late 20th century, an interest in women composers led to the rediscovery – and thence to the performance and recording – of many of her works. In December 2013, Farrenc was the subject of the long-running BBC Radio 3 programme Composer of the Week.

List of compositions
Farrenc wrote exclusively for the piano from 1820 to 1830, expanding her range to include works for orchestra beginning in 1834. Her work includes 49 compositions with opus numbers.

Orchestral works

 Symphony No. 1 in C minor, Op. 32 (1842)
 Symphony No. 2 in D major, Op. 35 (1845)
 Symphony No. 3 in G minor, Op. 36 (1847)
 Overture in E minor, Op. 23 (1834)
 Overture in E, Op. 24 (1834)
 Grand variations on the song "Le premier pas", for piano and orchestra, Op. 4
 Grand variations on a theme by Count Gallenberg, for piano and orchestra, Op. 25

Vocal works

Andréa la censurado, ballade
Je me taisais, romance
La tourterelle, romance
La madone
Le berger fidèle, romance
Le prisonnier de guerre, dramatic scene
Le suicide, scène et air (music same as Le prisonnier de guerre)
Toi que j'appelle

Choral works

O père qu'adore mon père (hymn by Lamartine), (unaccompanied choir)
O père qu'adore mon père (hymn by Lamartine), (choir and piano)
O salutaris hostia, (soprano, alto and tenor)

Chamber music

Nonet in E, Op. 38 (1849; string quartet and wind quintet)
Sextet in C minor, Op. 40 (1852; piano, flute, oboe, clarinet, bassoon and horn)
Piano Quintet No. 1 in A minor, Op. 30 (1839; piano, violin, viola, cello and double bass)
Piano Quintet No. 2 in E, Op. 31 (1840; piano, violin, viola, cello and double bass)
Trio in E, Op. 33 (1841–44; piano, violin and cello)
Trio in D, Op. 34 (1844; piano, violin and cello)
Trio in E, Op. 44 (1854–56; piano, clarinet and cello)
Trio in E minor, Op. 45 (1854–56; piano, flute and cello)
Concertante Variations on a Swiss tune, Op. 20 (piano and violin)
Sonata for violin and piano in C minor, Op. 37 (1848)
Sonata for violin and piano in A, Op. 39 (1850)
Sonata for cello and piano in B, Op. 46 (1857)
Grand Variations on the song Le premier pas, Op. 4

Piano works

Variations (Aristide Farrenc), Op. 2
Grandes variations Le premier pas, Op. 4 (piano solo)
Variations brillantes on a theme from La Cenerentola by Rossini, Op. 5
Variations sur l'air favori "O ma tendre musette!", Op. 6
Air suisse varié, Op. 7
Trois rondeaux, Op. 8
Rondeau sur un air du pirate de Bellini, Op. 9
Variations (George Onslow), Op. 10
Rondeau sur des thèmes dEuryanthe by Carl Maria von Weber, Op. 11
Variations (Galopade favorite), Op. 12
Rondeau (Rossini), Op. 13
Les italiennes, Op. 14
Variations brillantes (Donizetti), Op. 15
Les allemandes, Op. 16
Air russe varié, Op. 17
La Sylphide, Op. 18
Souvenir des Huguenots, Op. 19
Les jours heureux, Op. 21
Fugues, Op. 22
Trente études in all the major and minor keys, Op. 26 (1838)
Hymne russe varié, Op. 27
Variations sur un thème allemand, Op. 28
Variations (Bellini) Op. 29 (Piano four hands, arrangements for two or three pianos)
Douze études brillantes, Op. 41 (1853)
Vingt études de moyenne difficulté, Op. 42 (1854)
Trois mélodies, Op. 43
Scherzo, Op. 47
Valse brillante, Op. 48
1er nocturne, Op. 49
Vingt cinq études faciles, Op. 50
Deuxième valse brillante, Op. 51
Various works for piano, without opus numbers
Mélodie, without opus number

References

Citations

Sources

Further reading
 
 F. Launay, "Les Compositrices en France au XIXe siècle", Fayard, Paris, 2006.
 R. H. R. Silvertrust, "The Chamber Music of Louise Farrenc – Part I", Chamber Music Journal 14.3, Autumn 2003, Riverwoods, Illinois . Parts II and III in nos. 14.4 and 15.1.

External links
 

1804 births
1875 deaths
19th-century classical composers
19th-century French women classical pianists
19th-century French composers
French women classical composers
French music educators
French Romantic composers
Musicians from Paris
Women music educators
19th-century women composers